Hypsicratea or Hypsikrateia (flourished 63 BC), was the concubine, and perhaps wife, of King Mithridates VI of Pontus.

Life
Nothing is known of the family background of Hypsicratea, although it has been noted that her name suggests that her family came from the Cimmerian Bosporus. All the information about her relates to the final years of Mithridates' reign.

Hypsicratea accompanied Mithridates during his escape around the east coast of the Black Sea, following his final defeat by Pompey in 66 B.C. She probably died during an uprising in Phanagoria in 63 B.C. 

After Mithridates' defeat, Hypsicratea broke free of Pompey's blockade and while the rest dispersed she was one of only three who remained by the King's side. Plutarch wrote that she was:
"...always manly (androdes) and extremely bold, the king consequently liked to call her Hypsicrates.  At that time taking possession of a cloak and horse of a Persian man she neither flagged in body before the distances they ran nor did she weary of tending the body and horse of the king, until they came to a place called Sinor, which was full of the king's coins and treasures."

Valerius Maximus reports:
"The Queen Hypsicratea too loved her husband  Mithradates, with all the stops of affection let out, and for his sake she thought it a pleasure to change the outstanding splendor of her beauty for a masculine style.  For she cut her hair and habituated herself to horse and arms, so that she might more easily participate in his tools and danger. Indeed when he was defeated by Cn. Pompey, and fleeing through wild peoples, she followed him with body and soul equally indefatigable.  Her extraordinary fidelity was for  Mithridates his greatest solace and most pleasant comfort in those bitter and difficult conditions, for he considered that he was wandering with house and home because his wife was in exile along with him."

Epitaph
In 2004, a brief epitaph of Hypsicratea was discovered by archaeologists in Phanagoria. The epitaph uses the masculine version of her name, Hypsicrates - thus confirming what Plutarch said about her. It calls her "wife of King Mithridates Eupator Dionysos."

The epitaph was inscribed on a block of marble, which formed part of the base of a bronze statue of Hypsicratea. The statue has not survived, and it is impossible to know how it depicted her.

References

Sources
 Plutarch, Life of Pompey, 32.8
 Valerius Maximus, Factorum et dictorum memorabilium libri, 4.6.ext2

Bibliography

2nd-century BC women
1st-century BC women
Women in Hellenistic warfare
Queens of Pontus
People of Caucasus descent
Mithridatic dynasty